The African-American Film Critics Association Awards 2009, honoring the best in filmmaking of 2009, were given on December 14, 2009.

Top 10 Films
 Precious
 The Princess and the Frog
 Up in the Air
 The Hurt Locker
 This Is It
 American Violet
 Goodbye Solo
 Medicine for Melancholy
 Good Hair
 Up

Winners
Best Actor:
Morgan Freeman - Invictus
Best Actress:
Nicole Beharie - American Violet
Best Director:
Lee Daniels - Precious
Best Picture:
Precious
Best Screenplay: (tie)
Precious - Geoffrey S. Fletcher
The Princess and the Frog - Ron Clements, Rob Edwards, and John Musker
Best Supporting Actor:
Anthony Mackie - The Hurt Locker
Best Supporting Actress:
Mo'Nique - Precious

References 

 https://www.cleveland.com/call-and-post/2009/12/african-american_film_critics.html

2009 film awards
African-American Film Critics Association Awards